Kvitsund Gymnas is a Christian boarding high school in Kviteseid, Telemark, Norway.

It is one of the few private high schools in Norway. It is privately owned by the Norwegian Lutheran Mission (NLM). The school's current principal is Edgar Gamst Kristoffersen and there are currently about 140 students admitted to the school.

References 

Secondary schools in Norway
Lutheranism in Norway
High schools and secondary schools affiliated with the Lutheran Church
Christian schools in Norway